Vilasrao Gundewar was a member of the 10th Lok Sabha of India. He represented the Hingoli constituency of Maharashtra and is a member of the Shiv Sena political party.

References

India MPs 1991–1996
Living people
Marathi politicians
Shiv Sena politicians
Lok Sabha members from Maharashtra
People from Hingoli district
Year of birth missing (living people)